Sean Soriano (born October 6, 1989) is an American mixed martial artist who competed in the featherweight division of the UFC.

Background
Born and raised in Providence, Rhode Island, Soriano wrestled in Mount Pleasant High School Soriano and became the state championship in 145lbs in his senior year. He also played soccer and baseball successfully in the high school. Soriano begun training in mixed martial arts after graduating from the high school in 2007.

Mixed martial arts career 
He made his professional debut in 2009 competing primarily in regional promotions across New England before moving to South Florida in 2011 where he began training at Blackzilians. He compiled a record of 8–0, before signing with the UFC near the end of 2013.

Ultimate Fighting Championship 
Soriano made his promotional debut as a short notice replacement against Tatsuya Kawajiri on January 4, 2014 at UFC Fight Night 35, replacing an injured Hacran Dias.  Kawajiri won the back and forth fight via submission in the second round.

Soriano was expected to face Estevan Payan on April 19, 2014 at UFC on Fox 11. However, Soriano was forced to pull out due to injury and was replaced by Mike Brown. In turn, Brown was forced out of the bout and was replaced by promotional newcomer Alex White.

Soriano was expected to face Andre Fili on September 5, 2014 at UFC Fight Night 50.  However, Fili was forced from the bout with an injury and replaced by Chas Skelly.
Skelly won the fight via unanimous decision.

Soriano faced Charles Rosa on January 18, 2015 at UFC Fight Night 59.  Rosa won the bout via submission in the third round. Subsequently, Soriano was released from the promotion.

Post-UFC career
After his release from the UFC, Soriano fought Josh Quayhagen at Legacy FC 48 in late 2015, winning the fight via knockout.

In March 2016, Soriano fought Thomas Webb at Legacy FC 52. Soriano lost the fight via technical knockout.

Soriano fought fellow UFC veteran Levan Makashvili at CES MMA 38 on September 23, 2016 and lost the bout by way of rear-naked choke.

On May 12, 2017, Soriano fought Jacob Bohn at CES MMA 44, winning the fight via leg kicks.

After almost a year from his previous fight, Soriano fought Jonathan Gary at CES MMA 49 on April 6, 2018. He won the fight via rear-naked choke.

Soriano faced Bruce Boyington for the vacant featherweight belt at CES MMA 51 on August 3, 2018. Soriano lost the fight via rear-naked choke in the second round.

Soriano next faced Saul Almeida at CES MMA 57 on July 26, 2019. He won the fight via first-round knockout.

Soriano then faced Jose Mariscal at Cage Fury Fighting Championships 85 on September 18, 2020. He won the fight via unanimous decision.

Soriano faced Noad Lahat at UAE Warriors 18 on March 20, 2021. He won the fight via first-round knockout.

Return to UFC
Soriano was tabbed as a short notice replacement to face Christos Giagos on May 15, 2021 at UFC 262. He lost the bout via D'Arce choke in the second round.

Soriano faced Shayilan Nuerdanbieke on November 20, 2021 at UFC Fight Night 198. He lost the bout via unanimous decision.

On February 10, 2022, it was announced that Soriano was released by UFC.

Post UFC Part 2 
Soriano faced Paulo Silva on May 20, 2022 at Eagle FC 47. At weigh ins, Silva missed weight for the bout, weighing in at 156.6 pounds and was fined a percentage of his purse and the bout proceeded at catchweight. He lost the fight via split decision.

Mixed martial arts record

|-
|Loss
|align=center|14–9
|Paulo Silva
|Decision (split)
|Eagle FC 47
|
|align=center|3
|align=center|5:00
|Miami, Florida, United States
|
|-
|Loss
|align=center|14–8
|Shayilan Nuerdanbieke
|Decision (unanimous)
|UFC Fight Night: Vieira vs. Tate
|
|align=center|3
|align=center|5:00
|Las Vegas, Nevada, United States
|
|-
|Loss
|align=center|14–7
|Christos Giagos
|Technical Submission (brabo choke)
|UFC 262
|
|align=center|2
|align=center|0:59
|Houston, Texas, United States
|
|-
| Win
|align=center|14–6
|Noad Lahat
|TKO (punches)
|UAE Warriors 18
|
|align=center|1
|align=center|2:01
|Abu Dhabi, United Arab Emirates
|
|-
| Win
|align=center|13–6
|Jose Mariscal
|Decision (unanimous)
|Cage Fury FC 85
|
|align=center|3
|align=center|5:00
|Tunica, Mississippi, United States
|
|-
| Win
|align=center|12–6
|Saul Almeida
|KO (punches)
|CES MMA 57
|
|align=center|1
|align=center|1:22
|Lincoln, Rhode Island, United States
|
|-
| Loss
|align=center|11–6
|Bruce Boyington
|Submission (rear-naked choke)
|CES MMA 51
|
|align=center|2
|align=center|1:55
|Lincoln, Rhode Island, United States
|
|-
| Win
|align=center| 11–5
|Jonathan Gary
|Submission (rear-naked choke)
|CES MMA 49
|
|align=center|1
|align=center|1:21
|Lincoln, Rhode Island, United States
|
|-
| Win
|align=center| 10–5
|Jacob Bohn
|TKO (leg kicks)
|CES MMA 44
|
|align=center|2
|align=center|3:21
|Lincoln, Rhode Island, United States
|
|-
| Loss
|align=center| 9–5
|Levan Makashvili
|Submission (rear-naked choke)
|CES MMA 38
|
|align=center|2
|align=center|4:05
|Lincoln, Rhode Island, United States
|
|-
| Loss
|align=center| 9–4
|Thomas Webb
|TKO (punches)
|Legacy FC 52
|
|align=center|3
|align=center|1:25
|Lake Charles, Louisiana, United States
|
|-
| Win
|align=center| 9–3
|Josh Quayhagen
| KO (punch)
|Legacy FC 48
|
|align=center|1
|align=center|3:21
|Lake Charles, Louisiana, United States
|
|-
| Loss
|align=center| 8–3
|Charles Rosa
| Submission (D'Arce choke)
|UFC Fight Night: McGregor vs. Siver
|
|align=center|3
|align=center|4:43
|Boston, Massachusetts, United States
|
|-
| Loss
|align=center| 8–2
|Chas Skelly
| Decision (unanimous)
|UFC Fight Night: Jacare vs. Mousasi
|
|align=center|3
|align=center|5:00
|Mashantucket, Connecticut, United States
|
|-
| Loss
|align=center| 8–1
|Tatsuya Kawajiri
| Technical Submission (rear-naked choke) 
|UFC Fight Night: Saffiedine vs. Lim
|
|align=center|2
|align=center|0:50
|Marina Bay, Singapore
|
|-
| Win
|align=center| 8–0
|Elvin Leon Brito
| Decision (unanimous)
|CFA 11
|
|align=center|5
|align=center|5:00
|Coral Gables, Florida, United States
|
|-
| Win
|align=center| 7–0
|Victor Delgado
| Decision (unanimous)
|CFA 9
|
|align=center|5
|align=center|5:00
|Coral Gables, Florida, United States
|
|-
| Win
|align=center| 6–0
|Matthew Perry
| Submission (rear-naked choke)
|CFA 7
|
|align=center|1
|align=center|2:44
|Coral Gables, Florida, United States
|
|-
| Win
|align=center| 5–0
|Lee Metcalf
| KO (punches)
|CES MMA: Extreme Measures
|
|align=center|1
|align=center|0:34
|Lincoln, Rhode Island, United States
|
|-
| Win
|align=center| 4–0
|Lionel Young
| Technical Submission (triangle choke)
|AFO: Halloween Havoc 3
|
|align=center|1
|align=center|4:16
|Mansfield, Massachusetts, United States
|
|-
| Win
|align=center| 3–0
|Denis Hernandez
| TKO (doctor stoppage)
|UCC 1: Merciless
|
|align=center|2
|align=center|5:00
|Jersey City, New Jersey, United States
|
|-
| Win
|align=center| 2–0
|Mike Erosa
| Submission (guillotine choke)
|MAXX FC 4
|
|align=center|2
|align=center|1:25
|Carolina, Puerto Rico
|
|-
| Win
|align=center| 1–0
|Erick Herrera
| TKO (doctor stoppage)
|CFX 2
|
|align=center|1
|align=center|5:00
|Worcester, Massachusetts, United States
|
|-

See also 
 List of male mixed martial artists

References

External links

Living people
1989 births
American male mixed martial artists
Mixed martial artists from Rhode Island
People from Providence County, Rhode Island
Sportspeople from Providence, Rhode Island
Featherweight mixed martial artists
Mixed martial artists utilizing wrestling
Ultimate Fighting Championship male fighters
American male sport wrestlers
Amateur wrestlers